Scopula dentilinea is a moth of the family Geometridae. It was described by William Warren in 1897. It is found in Madagascar, Sierra Leone, São Tomé and Zambia.

References

Moths described in 1897
Moths of Africa
Moths of Madagascar
dentilinea
Taxa named by William Warren (entomologist)